Raj Bhavan (translation: Government House) is the official residence of the Current Governor of Assam. It is located in the capital city of Guwahati, Assam.  the present governor of Assam is Jagdish Mukhi.

See also
  Government Houses of the British Indian Empire

References

Governors' houses in India
Buildings and structures in Guwahati
Government of Assam